This is a list of notable Croatian Americans, including both original immigrants who obtained American citizenship and their American descendants.

To be included in this list, the person must have a Wikipedia article showing they are Croatian American or must have references showing they are Croatian American and are notable.

Academics
Mladen Bestvina – mathematician
Jaksa Cvitanic – professor of mathematical finance
William Feller – mathematician
Gordana Matic – mathematician
Emil M. Mrak – food scientist, microbiologist and former chancellor of the University of California, Davis
Vladimir Parpura – neuroscientist
Drazen Prelec – mathematician
Pasko Rakic – neuroscientist
David Sanjek – professor of music  
Marin Soljačić – professor of physics at MIT
Henry Suzzallo – president of the University of Washington
Victor Wickerhauser – mathematician

Artists
Ivan Meštrović – sculptor and professor at Syracuse and Notre Dame
Anton Perich – filmmaker, photographer and video artist
Michael Trcic – sculptor and special effects artist
Maksimiljan (Makso) Vanka – painter
Matthew Yuricich –  Academy Award-nominated special effects artist
Richard Yuricich – three-time Academy Award-nominated special effects artist

Entertainers

Actors
Eric Bana - actor
George Beban - actor, singer 
George Birimisa – playwright, actor, editor, director
Anna Chlumsky – actress
Al Christy - actor
Claire Dubrey – actress (father was from Dalmatia)
Jenna Elfman – television and movie actress (of partial Croatian descent; niece of Tony Butala)
Judah Friedlander – actor and comedian (mother of Croatian descent)
Mira Furlan – television and film actress
Jay Grdina – pornographic film actor
Gloria Grey – actress and director
John Malkovich – actor (father of Croatian descent)
Mark Matkevich – actor
Ivana Miličević – actress
John Miljan – actor
Patrick Muldoon – actor (mother of Croatian descent)
Rick Rossovich – actor (father of Croatian descent; brother of Tim Rossovich)
Tim Rossovich – actor (father of Croatian descent; brother of Rick Rossovich)
Mia Slavenska – prima ballerina of the Metropolitan Opera Ballet
Goran Višnjić – Croatian actor; became naturalized U.S. citizen
Louis Zorich – actor, musician

Screenwriters, directors, producers and film workers
Christina Cindrich – television producer and actress
Branko Lustig – movie producer, two-time Academy Award winner
Marty Pasetta – television producer and director
Frank Pavich – film director

Musicians
 Michael Bublé – singer
Nenad Bach – recording artist, composer, performer, producer and peace activist
Tony Butala – co-founder and member of the singing group The Lettermen (uncle of actress Jenna Elfman)
Dillon Francis – American electronic musician, record producer and DJ
Jim Korthe (1970–2010) – singer 
Stephen Kovacevich – pianist and conductor
Katrina Leskanich – singer
 Clair Marlo (born Clara Veseliza) – singer, songwriter, composer, record producer
Zeljko Marasovich – composer of classical and film music
Miljenko Matijevic – musician
Johnny Mercer – songwriter and singer (mother of Croatian and Irish descent)
Helen Merrill – jazz singer
Zinka Milanov – operatic soprano 
Tomo Miličević – musician, guitarist
Paul Mirkovich – musical director (The Voice)
Guy Mitchell – singer and actor
Krist Novoselic – musician, bassist 
David Paich – composer, producer and keyboardist
Marty Paich - pianist, composer, arranger, record producer, music director, and conductor
Walter Parazaider – founding member and saxophone player 
Tristan Perich – contemporary composer and sound artist
Steve Popovich - record producer
Plavka – singer
Paul Salamunovich – conductor, brother of producer Mike Salamunovich
Louis Svečenski – violinist
Milka Ternina – operatic soprano

Military personnel
Sylvester Antolak – US Army Sergeant, recipient of the Medal of Honor
Paul William Bucha – US Army Captain, recipient of the Medal of Honor; highly decorated American Vietnam War veteran; foreign policy adviser to Barack Obama's 2008 presidential campaign
Norman Cota – US Army Major General in WWII
Louis Cukela – double recipient of the Medal of Honor
Albert A. Francovich – Navy Cross recipient
Rade Grbitch – US Navy, recipient of the Medal of Honor
Ron Kovic – US Marine Corps, Vietnam War veteran; peace activist
Richard Marcinko – U.S. Navy SEAL commander and Vietnam War veteran  
Michael J. Novosel – US Army Chief Warrant Officer, recipient of the Medal Of Honor; veteran of World War II, Korean War, and Vietnam War 
Ivan L. Slavich, Jr. – United States Army colonel
Peter Tomich – US Navy Chief Watertender, WWII recipient of the Medal of Honor
John J. Tominac – US Army First Lieutenant, recipient of the Medal of Honor
Albert Vadas – US Navy, recipient of the Medal of Honor
Donald W. Wolf – Navy Cross recipient

Politicians
Michael D. Antonovich – Los Angeles County Supervisor, 5th District, nine terms from 1980 to 2016 (second longest tenure in Los Angeles County history); former California State Assemblyman for six years (Republican) 
Mark Begich – one-term U.S. Senator from Alaska; former mayor of Anchorage, Alaska (Democrat)
Nick Begich – U.S. Representative (D-AK; 2011-17) (Democrat)
Michael Bilandic – Illinois politician; Mayor of Chicago (Democrat)
John Bonacic – New York State Senator (Republican)
John Cherberg – politician, football coach, teacher and television executive
Renee Ellmers – U.S. Representative (R-NC; 2011-17); mother of partial Croatian descent
Frank Ivancie – Portland City Council; Mayor of Portland, Oregon (1980-85) (Democrat)
John Kasich – former member of U.S. House of Representatives (Ohio) and Governor of Ohio from 2011 to 2019 (Republican); mother of Croatian descent
Dennis Kucinich – former mayor of Cleveland; member of U.S. House of Representatives (D-Ohio); 2004 Democratic presidential candidate
Tony P. Mardesich – Washington State Representative from 1949 to 1950 (Democrat) 
August P. Mardesich – Washington State Representative from 1950 to 1963 (Democrat) 
John Martinis – Washington State Representative from 1969 to 1984 (Democrat)
Mary Matalin – political commentator, strategist and pundit;  assistant to U.S. President George W. Bush (Republican)
George W. Milias – California State Assemblyman from 1962 to 1970 (Republican) 
Rose Perica Mofford – 18th governor of Arizona from 1988 to 1991 (Democrat)
Emil Mrkonic – former member of the Pennsylvania State House of Representatives (Democrat) 
Tony Peraica – Cook County Commissioner for the 16th district; nominee for Cook County Board President in 2006 (Republican) 
Rudy Perpich – former governor, lieutenant governor, and United States Senator from Minnesota (Democrat)
George Radanovich – businessman (vintner); California politician; former member of U.S. House of Representatives (Republican)
Mark Sokolich – politician; Mayor of Fort Lee, New Jersey (Democrat) 
Michael A. Stepovich – politician; last governor of the Alaska Territory from 1957 to 1958 (Republican)
Rudy Svorinich – Los Angeles City Councilman and Council President Pro Tempore representing the 15th (Greater Harbor Area) district from 1993 to 2001 (Republican)
Vincent Thomas – represented San Pedro's 68th and 52nd Districts in the California State Assembly from 1941 to 1979 (Democrat)
Carmen Trutanich – Los Angeles City Attorney from 2009 to 2013 (Independent)
Andy Vidak – California State Senator for 16th district → then 14th district (Republican)

Scientists, inventors and engineers 
Lada Adamic – network scientist
Ralph S. Baric - epidemiologist
Tanja Bosak – geobiologist
Milislav Demerec – geneticist
Anthony Francis Lucas – oil explorer; inventor; organized with Pattillo Higgins the drilling of an oil well near Beaumont, Texas that became known as Spindletop, which led to the widespread exploitation of oil and the start of the petroleum age
Daniel Gajski – computer scientist
Anthony Grbic – electrical engineer
Victor Grinich – one of the "traitorous eight" who founded Silicon Valley
Terry Jonathan Hart – former astronaut
Hedvig Hricak – radiologist 
Brian Krzanich – CEO, Intel
Branka Ladanyi - physical chemist
John M. Martinis - physicist
John Miscovich – inventor
Egon Matijevic – chemist
Jacob Matijevic, Ph.D – NASA engineer, posthumously, NASA named a hill on Mars after him
Igor Mezić – mechanical engineer and mathematician
Paul L. Modrich – biochemist, 2015 Nobel Prize Winner 
Steven Z. Pavletic – NIH medical doctor, cancer researcher
Stephen Polyak – neuroanatomist
Andrija Puharich – medical and parapsychological researcher, medical inventor
Mario Puratić – inventor of the fishing Puretic power block
Mark Russinovich – Microsoft technical fellow
Nenad Sestan – neuroscientist
Vincent Sarich – chemist, anthropologist
Branimir Ivan Sikic – medical doctor
Jadranka Skorin-Kapov - operations research scientist
George M. Skurla – aeronautical engineer for the Apollo program, director of operations at the Kennedy Space Center, former president of the Grumman Corporation
Marin Soljacic – Ph.D professor of physics, electrical engineer at MIT; inventor
Davor Solter - biologist
James Spudich – biochemist

Sportspeople
 John Abramovic – former basketball player
 Mario Ancic – in legal department of the NBA; former professional tennis player, once ranked No. 7 in the world
 Marijon Ancich – football coach in California
 Johnny Babich – former baseball player
 Gary Beban – former NFL player, 1967 Heisman Trophy winner
 Bill Belichick – NFL football head coach; six-time Super Bowl winner with the New England Patriots 
 Steve Belichick – football player
 Pete Bercich – former NFL player and coach with the Minnesota Vikings; currently the color commentator on KFAN radio
 Scott Boras – sports agent
 Nick Burley, born Nicholas Barovich – bare-knuckle boxer, Heavyweight Champion of the Yukon Territory in 1902
 Pete Carroll – Super Bowl-winning coach, Seattle Seahawks; former USC football coach
 Tom Cecic – US National Soccer Team player
 Ann Cindric – All-American Girls Professional Baseball League player
 Ralph Cindrich – former NFL player
 Fred Couples – golfer (Croatian mother)
 Helen Crlenkovich - Diver,  Actress
 Lou Cvijanovich – California High School coach, only coach who won CIF titles in three different sports
 David Diehl – former football player and offensive lineman in the National Football League (Croatian mother)
 Duje Dukan – NBA basketball player 
 Bill Fralic – former professional American football offensive guard
 Gary Gabelich 
 Elvis Grbac – former NFL quarterback
 Bobby Grich – former MLB player
 Tom Haller – former MLB player
 John Havlicek – Naismith Memorial Basketball Hall of Fame (Croatian mother)
 Frankie Hejduk – US National Soccer Team player and member of the Columbus Crew
 Les Horvath – 1944 Heisman Trophy winner and former NFL quarterback
 Al Jurisich – former MLB player
 John Jurkovic – former NFL player
 Mirko Jurkovic – former football player
 Mike Karakas – NHL hockey player
 David Kopay – first professional athlete (American football) to be openly gay
 Joe Kuharich – former football player
 Larry Kuharich – former football coach
 Toni Kukoč – former NBA player
 Curtis Leskanic – baseball player
 Mickey Lolich – baseball player
 Tony Mandarich – NFL offensive player
 Marv Marinovich – retired American football offensive guard and sports trainer
 Todd Marinovich – former American and Canadian football quarterback
 Roger Maris – baseball player
 Dino Mattessich – former Maryland lacrosse coach, current University of Connecticut Sr. Assoc. Athletic Director
 John Mayasich — former hockey player
 Kevin McHale – former NBA player
 Catfish Metkovich – MLB player
 Joe Mihaljevic – former soccer player
 Ed Mikan – former NBA player 
 George Mikan – former NBA player
 Pat Miletich – martial artist
 Stipe Miocic – UFC heavyweight champion, only man to ever defend the title three consecutive times
 Rob Ninkovich – NFL player
 Jim Obradovich – former NFL player
 Erv Palica – former MLB pitcher
 Mark Pavelich – retired professional ice hockey player; member of the 1980 gold medal-winning USA "Miracle on Ice" team at the Winter Olympics
 George Perpich – former football player
 Johnny Pesky – former baseball player and announcer
 Dan Plesac – baseball player
 Gregg Popovich – NBA coach and five-time NBA champion
 Christian Pulisic – winger/attacking midfielder for the United States men's national soccer team and English Premier League club Chelsea
 Ed Puskarich – former soccer player
 Ante Razov – US National Soccer Team player 
 John Robic – Kentucky Basketball assistant coach
 Lou Saban – football coach
 Nick Saban – seven-time National Champion NCAA football coach
 Vladimir "Spider" Sabich – skier
 Buzz Schneider - member of the 1980 "USA Miracle on Ice" Olympic Ice Hockey Team
 Frank Sinkwich – Heisman trophy winner
 Joe Stydahar – former NFL player
 Andrew Susac – MLB player
 Joey Terdoslavich – MLB player
 John Tomac – cyclist
 Rudy Tomjanovich – NBA basketball player and Hall of Fame coach
 Auggie Vidovich II – driver in the NASCAR Busch Series
 Bill Vinovich – NFL official
 Danny Vranes (Vranješ) – professional basketball player (NBA); NBA All-Defensive Second Team 1985
 Fritzie Zivic – "Croat Comet", world boxing champion (welterweight)
 Mike Zordich – former NFL player
 Chris Zorich – former NFL player

Writers
Courtney Angela Brkic – anthropologist, writer
Michael Cunningham – author
Richard Kauzlarich – diplomat, writer, and intelligence analyst
Nicholas Kulish – author and journalist
Josip Marohnić – published the first book of Croatian poetry in America, Amerikanke
Ottessa Moshfegh – writer
Josip Novakovich – writer
Jason Smilovic – writer, executive producer
Tom Sunic – writer, former professor
Amanda Petrusich - music journalist

Others
Joan Biskupic – journalist
Steven Biskupic – former US Attorney
Blase Cardinal Cupich – Roman Catholic Archbishop of Chicago
Edward J. Damich – former judge and professor
John Owen Dominis – last Hawaiian royalty, by marriage to Hawaiian Queen Lydia Kamekaha Kapaaka in 1862
Mike Grgich – winemaker; 1976 winner at the Judgement of Paris for the Best White Wine in the world; inducted into the Vintner's Hall of Fame in 2008
Noma Gurich – judge serving as a justice of the Oklahoma Supreme Court
Jay Kordich (1923-2017) – "father of juicing" and the inventor of the Juiceman Juicer. Both his parents were Croatian immigrants from the island of Vis.
Bill Kurtis –  television journalist and producer
Michael Lah – cartoonist
Louis Lucas – winemaker
Capricia Penavic Marshall – Chief of Protocol of the United States (2009 to August 2013; father of Croatian descent)
Anthony Maglica – inventor, owner and founder of Mag Instrument Inc.
Boris Miksic – Cortec Corporation owner and founder
Zinka Milanov – operatic soprano 
Steve Nelson (born Stjepan Mesaros) – Spanish Civil War veteran and Communist Party leader
Katie Pavlich – journalist, blogger, political commentator, author, podcaster.
Kevin Radich – sports reporter
Bill Rancic – entrepreneur; husband of E! News' Giuliana DePandi
Gene Rayburn – radio and television personality
Tony Robbins – motivational speaker and author
Teresa Scanlan – Miss America 2011
Nicholas Sulentic – industrialist, creator of Sears Craftsman tool boxes, chests and cabinets
Miroslav Volf – Protestant theologian
Vanna White – television personality (biological father of Puerto Rican and Croatian descent; she was adopted and reared by her stepfather, whose name she took)

References

Croatian Americans

Croatian Americans
Croatian